Thomas W. Long (born October 26, 1929) is an American politician who served in the New Jersey General Assembly from the 20th Legislative District from 1983 to 1986.

References

1929 births
Living people
Democratic Party members of the New Jersey General Assembly
Politicians from Elizabeth, New Jersey